State Road 616 (SR 616) is an east–west road consisting of two wide streets near Tampa International Airport; West Spruce Street, and Boy Scout Boulevard. It runs from the interchange with Veterans Expressway (State Road 60) and George J. Bean Parkway to Dale Mabry Highway (U.S. Route 92 or US 92). In September 2001 the International Plaza shopping mall opened on the corner of SR 616 and West Shore Blvd.

State Road 616 was originally a free section of State Road 589 when SR 60/589 overlapped between Exits 1 and 2A. SR 589 was planned to be extended to a connecting road between I-275 & the Lee Roy Selmon Expressway, which would've lead to a change in the designation for West Spruce Street and Boy Scout Boulevard. The connection between the Veterans and Crosstown Expressways was cancelled, but the free section of SR 589 was converted anyway.

Major intersections

References

External links

616
616